Symmoca costobscurella is a moth in the family Autostichidae. It was described by Hans Georg Amsel in 1949. It is found in Iran.

References

Moths described in 1949
Symmoca